Verdala may refer to:
Hugues Loubenx de Verdalle (1531–1595), Grand Master of the Order of St. John
Verdala Palace, a palace in Siġġiewi, Malta
Fort Verdala, a fort in Cospicua, Malta
Verdala International School, a school in Pembroke, Malta